Mombasa County is one of the 47 counties of Kenya. Its capital is Mombasa. In terms of economic it is second after Nairobi. Initially it was one of the former districts of Kenya but in 2013 it was reconstituted as a county, on the same boundaries. It is the smallest county in Kenya, covering an area of 229.7 km2 excluding 65 km2 of water mass. The county is situated in the south eastern part of the former Coast Province. It borders Kilifi County to the north, Kwale County to the south west and the Indian Ocean to the east.  Administratively, the county is divided into seven divisions, eighteen locations and thirty sub-locations.

Kenya was divided into eight provinces prior to 2013, which were subdivided into 47 counties. In the former Coast Province there are six counties, Mombasa being one of them. It is situated in the southeast of Coast Province. It is the smallest in size, covering an area of 212.5 km2. The county lies between latitudes 3°56′ and 4°10′ south of the equator and longitudes 39°34′ and 39°46′ east.

Geographical area
The county and the city are divided into four divisions:
 
 Mombasa Island: 
 Changamwe: 
 Likoni: 
 Kisauni:

Demographics 
Mombasa is an urban city county and for this reason there is a large population of both local and immigrant communities. The local communities include the Mijikenda, Swahili and Kenyan Arabs. The Mijikenda is the largest community in Mombasa county making almost 35% of the total population in the county. The immigrant Kamba community is second largest ethnic community in the county making almost 30% of the total population of the county. The Kamba people have been known for their expansive knowledge of business and trade ranging from small scale to large scale followed closely by their GEMA counterparts.  Other significant immigrant communities include the Luo, Luhya and Somali communities.

Religion

Constituency
The county is composed of six Parliamentary constituencies:

Mombasa County lies within the coast lowland, which rises gradually from the sea level in the east to slightly over 76 m above sea level in the mainland west. The highest point is at Nguu Tatu hills in the mainland north that rises up to 100 m above sea level.

Services and urbanisation

See also

Lamu County

References

External links 
 Office for the Coordination of Humanitarian Affairs – Kenya AdminLevels 1–4
 Mombasa County at Hassan Joho for Governor
 County Data Sheet › Mombasa at Kenya Open Data
 Kwale County
 Kilifi County
 Tana River County
 Taita Taveta County

 
2013 establishments in Kenya
Counties of Kenya